The Symphony No. 6 in B minor, Op. 74, also known as the Pathétique Symphony, is Pyotr Ilyich Tchaikovsky's final completed symphony, written between February and the end of August 1893. The composer entitled the work "The Passionate Symphony", employing a Russian word, Патетическая (Pateticheskaya), meaning "passionate" or "emotional", which was then translated into French as pathétique, meaning "solemn" or "emotive".

It included some minor corrections that Tchaikovsky had made after the premiere, and was thus the first performance of the work in the exact form in which it is known today. It was the last of Tchaikovsky's compositions premiered in his lifetime; his last composition of all, the single-movement 3rd Piano Concerto, Op. 75, which was completed in October 1893, a short time before his death, received a posthumous premiere.

Title 
The Russian title of the symphony, Патетическая (Pateticheskaya), means "passionate" or "emotional", not "arousing pity," but it is a word reflective of a touch of concurrent suffering. Tchaikovsky considered calling it Программная (Programmnaya or "Program Symphony") but realized that would encourage curiosity about the program, which he did not want to reveal.

His brother Modest claims to have suggested the Патетическая title, which was used in early editions of the symphony; there are conflicting accounts about whether Tchaikovsky liked the title, but in any event his publisher chose to keep it and the title remained. Its French translation Pathétique is generally used in French, Spanish, English, German and other languages, Many English-speaking classical musicians had, by the early 20th century, adopted an English spelling and pronunciation for Tchaikovsky's symphony, dubbing it "The Pathetic", as shorthand to differentiate it from a popular 1798 Beethoven piano sonata also known as The Pathétique. Tchaikovsky's symphony was first published in piano reduction by Jurgenson of Moscow in 1893, and by Robert Forberg of Leipzig in 1894.

Background 
After completing his 5th Symphony in 1888, Tchaikovsky did not start thinking about his next symphony until April 1891, on his way to the United States. The first drafts of a new symphony were started in the spring of 1891. However, some or all of the symphony was not pleasing to Tchaikovsky, who tore up the manuscript "in one of his frequent moods of depression and doubt over his alleged inability to create". In 1892, Tchaikovsky wrote the following to his nephew Vladimir "Bob" Davydov:

The symphony is only a work written by dint of sheer will on the part of the composer; it contains nothing that is interesting or sympathetic. It should be cast aside and forgotten. This determination on my part is admirable and irrevocable.

This work was the Symphony in E, the first movement of which Tchaikovsky later converted into the one-movement 3rd Piano Concerto (his final composition), and the latter two movements of which Sergei Taneyev reworked after Tchaikovsky's death as the Andante and Finale.

In 1893, Tchaikovsky mentions an entirely new symphonic work in a letter to his brother:

I am now wholly occupied with the new work ... and it is hard for me to tear myself away from it. I believe it comes into being as the best of my works. I must finish it as soon as possible, for I have to wind up a lot of affairs and I must soon go to London. I told you that I had completed a Symphony which suddenly displeased me, and I tore it up. Now I have composed a new symphony which I certainly shall not tear up.

The symphony was written in a small house in Klin and completed by August 1893. Tchaikovsky left Klin on 19 October for the first performance in Saint Petersburg, arriving "in excellent spirits". However, the composer began to feel apprehension over his symphony, when, at rehearsals, the orchestra players did not exhibit any great admiration for the new work. Nevertheless, the premiere was met with great appreciation. Tchaikovsky's brother Modest wrote, "There was applause and the composer was recalled, but with more enthusiasm than on previous occasions. There was not the mighty, overpowering impression made by the work when it was conducted by Eduard Nápravník, on November 18, 1893, and later, wherever it was played."

Instrumentation
The symphony is scored for an orchestra with the following instruments:

Woodwinds
3 flutes (3rd doubling piccolo)
2 oboes
2 clarinets (in A)
2 bassoons
Brass
4 horns
2 trumpets
3 trombones
1 tuba

Percussion
timpani
bass drum
cymbals
tam-tam (ad libitum)
Strings
violins I, II
violas
cellos
double basses

Although not called for in the score, a bass clarinet is commonly employed to replace the solo bassoon for the four notes immediately preceding the Allegro vivo section of the first movement, which originates from Austrian conductor Hans Richter.

Music

The symphony is in four movements:

I. Adagio – Allegro non troppo 
The first movement, in sonata form, frequently alternates speed, mood, and key, with the main key being B minor. It opens quietly with a low bassoon melody in E minor. Violas appear with the first theme of the Allegro in B minor, a faster variant of the slow opening melody. This eventually leads to the lyrical secondary theme in D major.

The energetic development section begins abruptly, with an outburst from the orchestra in C minor, but soon transitions to D minor. It runs seamlessly into the fortissimo recapitulation, whose atmosphere is completely different from its rather hesitant equivalent at the beginning of the exposition. At some point, the main theme of the movement is being restated. Tchaikovsky soon goes into something more nightmarish, which culminates in an explosion of despair and misery in B minor, accompanied by a strong and repetitive 4-note figure in the brass. This explosion concludes in a powerful note in the trombones marked quadruple forte, a rare dynamic mark intending the instrument to be played as loud as possible. This section ends with diminishing strains on the basses and brass, and is a section that truly reveals the pathos and upcoming emotions of the symphony. The movement concludes shortly after the recapitulation of the second subject shown above, this time in the tonic major (B major) with a coda which is also in B major, finally ending very quietly.

II. Allegro con grazia 
The second movement, a dance movement in ternary form, is in  time, in D major. It has been described as a "limping" waltz. The opening contrasts with the darker B section in the tonic minor of the symphony, B minor. A graceful coda leads to a quiet ending.

III. Allegro molto vivace 
The third movement is in a compound meter ( and ) and in sonatina form. It begins with strings in a fast, exciting motif playing semiquavers against a woodwind  meter. It leads to the E major secondary theme in the exposition beginning with clarinet solo with string accompaniment. Between the exposition and the recapitulation, there is no development section – only 2 bars of retransition. The opening theme reappears, now the first theme in the recapitulation, which later leads to the secondary theme but this time in G major and march-like. The movement ends with a coda triumphantly, almost as a deceptive finale. It is probably no coincidence that the movement, with its stormy character through restless strings, wind-like whistling woodwinds and thundering brass instruments, is reminiscent of the finale from Joachim Raff's Symphony No. 3 "In the forest"; the symphony was one of the most played of its time and Tchaikovsky had already been inspired by Raff in his 5th Symphony with its famous horn solo.

IV. Adagio lamentoso 
Back in B minor, the fourth movement is a slow movement in a six-part sonata rondo form (A-B-A-C-A-B). Beginning instantly with the exposition and the opening A theme, melody on the first and second violins appears frequently through the movement. The theme is a "composite melody"; neither the first nor second violins actually play the theme that is heard.

A calmer relative D-major segment (the B subject) builds into a full orchestral palette with brass and percussion, ending with a C major chord. After a pause, the mournful motif, back in B minor, leads into the restatement of the A theme.

Similar to the first movement, the turbulent climax, with timpani rolls and a descending sequence on the strings, lies in the development section (the C theme). This is followed by a more agitated restatement of the opening A theme (the start of the recapitulation), on an F bass pedal. Then, the music and the F begin to fade away, and a gong quietly opens a somber funeral–like chorale with the trombones and the tuba. The following B section, originally a break in the clouds, is very mournful, since this time it is in the tonic B minor instead of D major.

The melody is then repeated with lower notes on cellos, basses, and bassoon and finally ending quietly again in B minor and in total tragedy, as if the fade out occurs. Among Tchaikovsky's symphonies, this is the only one to end in a minor key. His first, second, fourth and fifth symphonies, plus the Manfred Symphony, are all minor-key symphonies that end in the tonic major, while the home key of his third symphony is D major (even though it begins in D minor) and that of his unfinished Symphony in E (unofficially "No. 7") is E major.

It is also extremely unusual for a slow movement to come at the end of a symphony. Had Tchaikovsky followed the standard four-movement structure, the movements would have been ordered like this:

Interpretation

Tchaikovsky critic Richard Taruskin writes:
Suicide theories were much stimulated by the Sixth Symphony, which was first performed under the composer's baton only nine days before his demise, with its lugubrious finale (ending morendo, 'dying away'), its brief but conspicuous allusion to the Orthodox requiem liturgy in the first movement and above all its easily misread subtitle. ... When the symphony was done again a couple of weeks later, in memoriam and with subtitle in place, everyone listened hard for portents, and that is how the symphony became a transparent suicide note. Depression was the first diagnosis. 'Homosexual tragedy' came later.

As critic Alexander Poznansky also writes, "Since the arrival of the 'court of honour' theory in the West, performances of Tchaikovsky's last symphony are almost invariably accompanied by annotations treating it as a testimony of homosexual martyrdom." Yet critic David Brown describes the idea of the Sixth Symphony as some sort of suicide note as "patent nonsense". Other scholars, including Michael Paul Smith, believe that with or without the supposed 'court of honour' sentence, there is no way that Tchaikovsky could have known the time of his own death while composing his last masterpiece. There is also evidence that Tchaikovsky was unlikely to have been depressed while composing the symphony, with his brother noting of him after he had sent the manuscript for publishing, "I had not seen him so bright for a long time past."

Dedication and suggested programs
Tchaikovsky dedicated the Pathétique to his nephew, Vladimir "Bob" Davydov, whom he greatly admired.

The Pathétique has been the subject of a number of theories as to a hidden program. This goes back to the first performance of the work, when fellow composer Nikolai Rimsky-Korsakov asked Tchaikovsky whether there was a program to the new symphony, and Tchaikovsky asserted that there was, but would not divulge it.

A suggested program has been what Taruskin disparagingly termed "symphony as suicide note". This idea began to assert itself as early as the second performance of the symphony in Saint Petersburg, not long after the composer had died. People at that performance "listened hard for portents. As always, they found what they were looking for: a brief but conspicuous quotation from the Russian Orthodox requiem at the stormy climax of the first movement, and of course the unconventional Adagio finale with its tense harmonies at the onset and its touching depiction of the dying of the light in conclusion".  Countering this is Tchaikovsky's statement on 26 September/8 October 1893 that he was in no mood to write any sort of requiem.  This was in reply to a suggestion from his close friend Grand Duke Konstantin that he write a requiem for their mutual friend the writer Aleksey Apukhtin, who had died in late August, just as Tchaikovsky was completing the Pathétique.

Tchaikovsky specialist David Brown suggests that the symphony deals with the power of Fate in life and death. This program would not only be similar to those suggested for the Fourth and Fifth Symphonies, but also parallels a program suggested by Tchaikovsky for his unfinished Symphony in E. That program reads, "The ultimate essence ... of the symphony is Life.  First part – all impulse, passion, confidence, thirst for activity.  Must be short (the finale death – result of collapse).  Second part love: third disappointments; fourth ends dying away (also short)."

In popular culture

The second theme of the first movement formed the basis of a popular song in the 1940s, "(This is) The Story of a Starry Night" (by Mann Curtis, Al Hoffman and Jerry Livingston) which was popularized by Glenn Miller. This same theme is the music behind "Where", a 1959 hit for Tony Williams and the Platters as well as "In Time", by Steve Lawrence in 1961, and "John O'Dreams" by Bill Caddick. All four songs have different lyrics.  It was also used to great effect in one of the early Cinerama movies in the mid-50s.

Excerpts from the symphony can be heard in a number of films, including Victor Young’s theme for Howard Hughes’ 1943 American Western The Outlaw, 1942’s Now, Voyager, the 1997 version of Anna Karenina, as well as The Ruling Class, Minority Report, Sweet Bird of Youth, Soylent Green, Maurice, The Aviator, and The Death of Stalin. It has also accompanied the cartoon The Ren & Stimpy Show, specifically the episode 'Son of Stimpy' where the eponymous cat walks out into a blizzard.

The Nice included Keith Emerson's arrangement of the third movement on their 1971 album Elegy.

The third movement of Tchaikovsky's Sixth Symphony was featured during the 2010 Winter Olympics closing ceremony, being danced by Russia's national ballet company.

A slower, synthesised version was utilised in the 2011 video game Pandora's Tower.

The sixth symphony is used extensively in a 2011 collaborative art film by Šejla Kamerić, 1395 Days Without Red, currently part of the Pinault Collection at the Punta della Dogana in Venice. An orchestra rehearses different sections of the symphony in the short film, as a woman is filmed walking through Sarajevo. The woman and the orchestra each stop and start, to express the manner in which ordinary people moved through the city during the siege of Sarajevo.

Tchaikovsky's Sixth is featured in the 2014 sci-fi video game Destiny, during several missions in which the player must interact with a Russian supercomputer, Rasputin, who serves as a planetary defense system.

Tchaikovsky's Sixth plays a major role in E. M. Forster's novel Maurice (written in 1913 and later, but unpublished until 1971), where it serves as a veiled reference to homosexuality.

Notes

Sources
 
 
 
  
 
 |

Further reading
 Cross, Milton and Ewen, David, "Peter Ilitch Tchaikovsky", in vol. II of Milton Cross' Encyclopedia of Great Composers and Their Music (Garden City, New York: Doubleday, 1962).
Holden, Anthony, Tchaikovsky: A Biography (New York: Random House, 1995). .
Keller, Hans, "Peter Ilyich Tchaikovsky", in vol. I of The Symphony, ed. Robert Simpson (Harmondsworth, 1966).
Ritzarev, Marina, Tchaikovsky's Pathétique and Russian Culture (Ashgate, 2014). .

External links

Symphonies by Pyotr Ilyich Tchaikovsky
Music dedicated to family or friends
1893 compositions
Compositions in B minor
Compositions by Pyotr Ilyich Tchaikovsky published posthumously